Galib Musa oglu Jafarov;  is a Kazakh boxer of Azerbaijani descent, best known to win the gold medal at the 2003 World Amateur Boxing Championships in the Featherweight (– 57 kg) division.

Career
In 2001 he lost the final to Turkish legend Ramaz Paliani but two years later he gained the gold medal at the World Championships. He competed at the 2004 Summer Olympics, but was defeated in the quarterfinals by Alexei Tichtchenko of Russia, who eventually won the competition. Jafarov qualified for the Athens Games by winning the gold medal at the 2004 Asian Amateur Boxing Championships in Puerto Princesa, Philippines. In the final he defeated South Korea's Jo Seok-Hwan.

At the 2006 Asian Games he lost to Zorigtbaataryn Enkhzorig and won bronze.

References
 Profile on Yahoo! Sports
 

1978 births
Living people
Kazakhstani people of Azerbaijani descent
Boxers at the 2004 Summer Olympics
Boxers at the 2008 Summer Olympics
Olympic boxers of Kazakhstan
Asian Games medalists in boxing
Boxers at the 2002 Asian Games
Boxers at the 2006 Asian Games
Kazakhstani male boxers
AIBA World Boxing Championships medalists
Asian Games bronze medalists for Kazakhstan
Asian Games silver medalists for Kazakhstan
Medalists at the 2006 Asian Games
Medalists at the 2002 Asian Games
Featherweight boxers
People from Aktobe
21st-century Kazakhstani people